Harry Decheiver (born 8 March 1970) is a Dutch former professional footballer who played as a striker in the Netherlands and Germany.

After having played four seasons for Go Ahead Eagles (1986–1990) he served SC Heerenveen (1990–1991), RKC Waalwijk (1991–1994), Go Ahead Eagles (1995), SC Freiburg (1995–1997), FC Utrecht (1997) and, finally, Borussia Dortmund (1997–1999). He retired early due to injury.

Club career

SC Freiburg
Decheiver joined Bundesliga side SC Freiburg from Go Ahead Eagles in winter 1995 for a reported transfer fee of DM 700,000, signing a contract until 1997. Upon his arrival, the club ranked last in the Bundesliga table but finished the season in 11th spot with Decheiver contributing 11 goals. Two of these goals came in March 1996 as Freiburg managed a rare win against Bayern Munich. In March 1997, Decheiver agreed to the termination of his contract parting in anger with the club. He had been criticised for his lack of defensive work while his teammates had accused him of "arrogant und provocative" behaviour and spoken out in favour of his rivals Uwe Wassmer and Uwe Spies. Freiburg was relegated from the Bundesliga at the end of 1996–97 season. During his time at Freiburg, he was nicknamed "Knipser" and scored a total of 21 goals in 49 appearances for the club across all competitions.

Utrecht
In April 1997, Decheiver surprisingly returned to the Netherlands joining FC Utrecht. He rejected offers from 1. FC Köln, VfB Stuttgart, and SBV Vitesse. He signed a four-year contract.

Borussia Dortmund
In November 1997, Decheiver signed a three-and-a-half-year contract with Borussia Dortmund. The transfer fee paid to Utrecht was reported as DM2.7 million.

Honours
Borussia Dortmund
Intercontinental Cup: 1997

References

External links
 
 Profile 

1970 births
Living people
Expatriate footballers in Germany
Dutch footballers
Dutch expatriate footballers
Association football forwards
Go Ahead Eagles players
SC Heerenveen players
RKC Waalwijk players
FC Utrecht players
SC Freiburg players
Borussia Dortmund players
Bundesliga players
Eredivisie players
Footballers from Deventer
Dutch expatriate sportspeople in Germany